Jonas Daniliauskas  (born 10 June 1950 Lekėčių) is a Lithuanian painter.

In 1974, he graduated from Lithuanian Institute of Fine Arts; he was a student of Jonas Švažas and Algirdas Petrulis.

Works
His work is in the collection of Edmundas Armoška.
He shows at Stasys Juskus Gallery.

Awards
1979 the premium of the Lithuanian Ministry of Culture;
1985 the first prize of the Lithuanian Ministry of Culture at the 4th Bienalle of the Baltic Countries;
1985 the first prize at the 11th Bienalle of the Baltic Countries and Island in Rostok (Germany);
1999 the premium of the Lithuanian union of Artists.

Solo shows
 Vilnius - 1976, 1978, 1982, 1989, 1994–1997, 1999, 2000, 2002, 2010
 Kaunas - 1996
 Klaipeda, Lithuania - 1996
 Chandigarh - 1997
 Baden, Switzerland - 1997
 Zurich - 1998
 Greifswald - 1999
 Warsaw - 2000
 London - 2000–2001,

See also
List of Lithuanian painters

References

External links
Artist's website
"Jonas Daniliauskas", Lithuanian Wikipedia
"Jonas Daniliauskas", Fructusartis

Lithuanian painters
1950 births
Living people
Vilnius Academy of Arts alumni